Champion System Pro Cycling Team was a Chinese professional cycling team, that competed between 2010 and 2013. The team was based in China and it participated in UCI Professional Continental and UCI World Tour races. In an interview in October 2013 the team's general manager Ed Beamon announced that the team would disband at the end of the season due to its main sponsor withdrawing their support.

Final team roster

Major results
2011
 Stage 4 Tour de Korea, Jaan Kirsipuu
 Jūrmala GP, Jaan Kirsipuu
  Road Race Championships, Mart Ojavee
 Stage 4 Tour of Hainan, Deon Locke
2012
 Prologue (ITT) Tour of Japan, Will Clarke
 Stage 2 Tour de Beauce, Craig Lewis
2013
 Stage 4 Tour de Taiwan, Zachary Bell
 Stage 6 Tour de Korea, Zachary Bell
  Road Race Championships, Zachary Bell
  Road Race Championships, Matt Brammeier
  Road Race Championships, Feng Chun-kai
  Time Trial Championships, Feng Chun-kai

References

External links

Defunct cycling teams
Cycling teams established in 2010
Cycling teams disestablished in 2013
Cycling teams based in Hong Kong
Former UCI Professional Continental teams